Joy in the Morning is a 1965 American romance film starring Richard Chamberlain and Yvette Mimieux and directed by Alex Segal. Adapted from the 1963 novel of the same name by Betty Smith, the film tells the story of a young newlywed couple, Carl and Annie Brown, who marry against their parents' wishes while Carl is still in law school and struggle to maintain their relationship.

Plot
In the late 1920s, 18-year-old Annie McGairy travels from Brooklyn to a college town in the Midwest to marry her boyfriend Carl Brown, a law student, at the local courthouse. The newlyweds must overcome many obstacles, including disapproval from their parents (who knew each other before emigrating to the U.S. from Ireland), financial problems, and Annie's sexual insecurities. Due to the marriage, Carl's law school cuts off his loans, and his father cuts off support from home, forcing Carl to work multiple jobs on top of studying. Annie causes gossip in the town by befriending a lonely, gay florist and babysitting for the mistress of a married businessman.

Annie discovers she is pregnant, but before she can tell Carl, the couple have a heated argument caused by the stress of his night job interfering with the couple's marital intimacy. Annie leaves Carl and returns to her mother in Brooklyn, without telling Carl she is pregnant, not wanting to burden him while he finishes his education. Devastated by the loss of Annie, Carl's schoolwork suffers, putting him in danger of failing all his classes. When Carl's father discovers the situation, including Annie's now-obvious pregnancy, his attitude toward Annie softens, and he convinces the couple to reconcile. Annie helps Carl to catch up in his studies and pass his exams on the same day Annie gives birth. Carl graduates, and he and Annie celebrate a church wedding with family and friends before happily riding away with their new baby son.

Cast
 Richard Chamberlain – Carl Brown
 Yvette Mimieux – Annie McGairy Brown
 Arthur Kennedy – Patrick Brown
 Oskar Homolka – Stan Pulaski
 Donald Davis – Anthony Byrd
 Joan Tetzel – Beverly Karter
 Sidney Blackmer – Dean James Darwent
 Virginia Gregg – Mrs. Lorgan
 Chris Noel – Mary Ellen Kincaid
 Bartlett Robinson – Professor Victor Newcole
 Ellen Atterbury – Marriage License Clerk
 Harvey Stephens – Dr. Marson
 Ira Barmak – Dr. Kirkson

Production
The film was based on a 1963 novel by Betty Smith, who had written A Tree Grows in Brooklyn. Her fourth novel, it was based on her own life; she married during the Depression and lived near campus while her husband studied law. "I had to return to that background", she said. "That's where I was born." (The marriage later ended in divorce.) Film rights were bought by MGM in June  1963 for a minimum of $100,000.

In January 1964, the lead role was given to Richard Chamberlain, who was at that time a teen idol and the star of the MGM TV series Dr. Kildare. His co-star was Yvette Mimieux, who was also under contract to MGM, and had played Chamberlain's love interest in a two-part episode of Dr. Kildare. Filming started in May 1964.

Producer Henry Weinstein said he wanted to make a romance in the James Stewart–Margaret Sullavan tradition. Mimieux called the film "light and charming".

The film's score was composed by Bernard Herrmann. Chamberlain sang the title song "Joy in the Morning", released as a single and included on his 1964 album Richard Chamberlain.

Chris Noel, who played a college student in the film, later wrote a book with editor and designer Kirk Kimball about the making of the film, titled Filming Joy in the Morning: Behind the Scenes with Richard Chamberlain.

Reception
According to one report, at preview of the film the audience "laughed in all the wrong places."

The film made $1.7 million in North America.

See also
 List of American films of 1965

References

External links
 
 
 
 
 Joy in the Morning at Letterbox DVD
 Review at Variety

1965 films
1965 romantic drama films
American romantic drama films
1960s English-language films
Films based on American novels
Films directed by Alex Segal
Films scored by Bernard Herrmann
Films set in 1927
Films set in 1928
Films set in universities and colleges
Metro-Goldwyn-Mayer films
American pregnancy films
1960s pregnancy films
1960s American films